Thomas Bilson (1655–1692) was an MP for Petersfield during the late 17th century.

Bilson's father Leonard had been the Petersfield's MP from 1667 to 1681. He was admitted to Lincoln's Inn in 1673. In 1678 he married Susannah née Legg.

References

People from Petersfield
17th-century English people
English MPs 1685–1687
English MPs 1689–1690
1655 births
1692 deaths